Yahya  may refer to:

 Yahya (name), a common Arabic male given name
 Yahya (Zaragoza), 11th-century ruler of Zaragoza
 John the Baptist in Islam, also known as Yaḥyā ibn Zakarīyā

See also
 Tepe Yahya, an archaeological site in Kermān Province, Iran
 An ancient culture known as Yahya culture